John Glavin (born 16 February 1944) is a British sprint canoer who competed in the late 1960s. He was eliminated in the semifinals of the K-1 1000 m event at the 1968 Summer Olympics in Mexico City.

References
Sports-reference.com profile

Canoeists at the 1968 Summer Olympics
Olympic canoeists of Great Britain
1944 births
Living people
British male canoeists